This list of tallest buildings in Iowa ranks skyscrapers in the US state of Iowa by height for existing and proposed structures.

Tallest buildings

Note: Churches have been omitted from this list.

Tall buildings prior to 1884

There does not seem to have been any effort to document the tallest building in Iowa prior to the construction of the State Capitol in 1884. This list shows buildings which may have been the tallest in Iowa prior to 1884, excluding church steeples.

Other early tall building include:
Mount Ida Female College, Davenport, 1856. First four-story dwelling, later had a high dome placed on top, may have rivaled Old Capitol in height.
Fort Madison, 1808, probably the first two-story buildings in what would become Iowa.

References

Iowa

Tallest